The Aberdeen Cultural Centre is an Acadian cultural cooperative containing multiple studios and galleries and is located on Botsford Street in Moncton, New Brunswick. The Centre houses the Galerie Sans Nom, which presents art exhibitions that showcase current trends in visual arts, concentrating on artists from across Canada. Also active in the centre is the Imago Artist-Run Print Studio, which is a production centre devoted to the continued development and dissemination of printmaking.

The Aberdeen Cultural Centre is located in the building that once housed Aberdeen High School, built in 1898.

Affiliations
The Museum is affiliated with: CMA,  CHIN, and Virtual Museum of Canada.

See also
 Events in Greater Moncton
 Frye Festival

External links

 

Art museums and galleries in New Brunswick
Museums in Moncton
Burned buildings and structures in Canada
Rebuilt buildings and structures in Canada
Culture of Moncton
1990 establishments in New Brunswick
Art museums established in 1990
Community centres in Canada
Former school buildings in Canada